Andrei Macrițchii (born 13 February 1996) is a Moldovan football player.

Club career
He made his Moldovan National Division debut for Sheriff Tiraspol on 31 May 2013 in a game against Nistru Otaci.

International
He made his debut for senior Moldova national football team on 26 February 2018 in a friendly against Saudi Arabia.

Personal life
He is a twin brother of Valerii Macrițchii.

Honours 
FC Sheriff Tiraspol

 Divizia Națională: 2012–13, 2013–14,, 2015–16
 Divizia "A": 2016–17
 Moldovan Super Cup: 2015

References

External links
 

1996 births
Living people
Moldovan footballers
Association football forwards
Moldova youth international footballers
Moldova under-21 international footballers
Moldova international footballers
FC Sheriff Tiraspol players
FC Tiraspol players
CS Petrocub Hîncești players
FC Sfîntul Gheorghe players
FC Dinamo-Auto Tiraspol players
Moldovan Super Liga players
Liga II players
FC Ripensia Timișoara players
Twin sportspeople
Moldovan twins
Moldovan expatriate footballers
Moldovan expatriate sportspeople in Romania
Expatriate footballers in Romania